The Aero Boero AB-210 is an Argentine civil utility aircraft, a development of the AB-180 with improved performance delivered by a fuel-injected engine.  Unlike previous aircraft by this manufacturer, it also featured tricycle undercarriage, but retained the same general high-wing configuration. Only a single prototype was built, first flying on 22 April 1971.

The aircraft was later re-engined with a more powerful Lycoming O-540 and redesignated the AB-260 (not to be confused with the unrelated Aero Boero 260AG). A second example was also built to this standard, but no serial production ensued.

Variants
AB-210
The basic version developed from the AB-180, powered by a Continental IO-360 engine, one built.
AB-260
Further proposed development powered by a 260hp (194kW) Lycoming O-540 engine, one built.

Specifications (AB-210)

References
Notes

BIbliography
Taylor,John W. R. Jane's All The World's Aircraft 1971–72. London:Jane's Yearbooks,1971. .

Aero Boero aircraft
1970s Argentine civil utility aircraft
High-wing aircraft
Single-engined tractor aircraft